You Again is the third studio album by the American country music group The Forester Sisters. It was released in 1987 via Warner Records Nashville.

Content
Three singles charted from the album: a cover of Brenda Lee's 1965 single "Too Many Rivers", followed by the title track and "Lyin' in His Arms Again". Of these, "You Again" achieved the number one position on Hot Country Songs in 1987, while the other two both peaked at number five on the same.

"Sooner or Later" was later covered by Eddy Raven, who released it in 1990 as a single from his album Temporary Sanity. As with the Forester Sisters' version, Raven's was also produced by Barry Beckett.

Track listing

Personnel

The Forester Sisters 
 Christy Forester – vocals 
 June Forester – vocals
 Kathy Forester – vocals
 Kim Forester – vocals

Musicians 
 John Barlow Jarvis – keyboards (1, 5, 7, 10)
 Barry Beckett – keyboards (2, 6, 9)
 Mitch Humphries – keyboards (2, 6, 9)
 Carl Marsh – Fairlight Series III computer programming (2, 6, 9)
 Steve Nathan – keyboards (3, 4, 8), synthesizers (3, 4, 8)
 Larry Byrom – acoustic guitar (1, 5, 7, 10), electric guitar (1, 5, 7, 10)
 Reggie Young – electric guitar (1, 5, 7, 10)
 Mark Casstevens – acoustic guitars (2, 6, 9), mandolin (2, 6, 9)
 Brent Rowan – lead guitar (2, 6, 9), rhythm guitar (2, 6, 9)
 Will McFarlane – acoustic guitar (3, 4, 8)
 J.L. Wallace – electric guitars (3, 4, 8)
 John Willis – acoustic guitar (3, 4, 8)
 Paul Franklin – pedal steel guitar (1, 5, 7, 10)
 Sonny Garrish – steel guitar (2, 6, 9), pedal steel guitar (3, 4, 8)
 Emory Gordy Jr. – bass guitar (1, 5, 7, 10)
 Bob Wray – bass guitar (2, 6, 9)
 Terry "Bus" Adkins – bass guitar (3, 4, 8)
 Lonnie "Butch" Ledford – bass guitar (3, 4, 8)
 Larrie Londin – drums (1, 5, 7, 10)
 Owen Hale – drums (2, 3, 4, 6, 8, 9)
 Buddy Spicher – fiddle (2, 6, 9)
 Hoot Hester – fiddle (3, 4, 8)

Production 
 Emory Gordy Jr. – producer (1, 5, 8, 10)
 Barry Beckett – producer (2, 6, 9)
 James Stroud – producer (2, 6, 9)
 Terry Skinner – producer (3, 4, 8), assistant engineer (3, 4, 8), remix assistant 
 J.L. Wallace – producer (3, 4, 8)
 George Clinton – engineer (1, 5, 8, 10)
 Jim Cotton – engineer (1, 5, 8, 10)
 Paul Goldberg – engineer (1, 5, 8, 10)
 Joe Scaife – engineer (1, 5, 8, 10)
 Bill Deaton – engineer (2, 6, 9)
 Steve Melton – engineer (3, 4, 8), remixing 
 Tim Farmer – assistant engineer (2, 6, 9)
 Greg Pirls – assistant engineer (2, 6, 9)
 Randy Best – assistant engineer (3, 4, 8)
 Vicki Lancaster – assistant engineer (3, 4, 8), remix assistant 
 Steve Moore – assistant engineer (3, 4, 8)
 Scott Hendricks – remixing 
 Chris Hammond – remix assistant 
 Denny Purcell – mastering 
 Carlos Grier – mastering assistant 
 Virginia Team – album design 
 Andy Engel – lettering design 
 Empire Studio – photography 
 Joan Robbins – wardrobe stylist 
 June Arnold – make-up 
 Marilyn Thomason – hair stylist 
 Gerald Roy and Stellar Entertainment – management 

Studios
 Recorded at Muscle Shoals Sound Studios (Sheffield, Alabama); East Avalon Recorders (Muscle Shoals, Alabama); The Music Mill, Woodland Studios, Center Stage Studio and Champagne Studios (Nashville, Tennessee).
 Remixed at The Castle (Franklin, Tennessee) and Muscle Shoals Sound Studios.
 Mastered at Georgetown Masters (Nashville, Tennessee).

Chart performance

References

1987 albums
The Forester Sisters albums
albums produced by Barry Beckett
albums produced by James Stroud
Warner Records albums